This is a list of Jacksonville State Gamecocks football players in the NFL Draft.

Key

Selections

References

Jacksonville State

Jacksonville State Gamecocks NFL Draft